Maolmórdha may refer to:

 Máel Mórda mac Murchada (died 1014), King of the province of Leinster in Ireland
 Mael Morda mac Conchobair (12th century), king of Uí Failghe
 Mael Morda mac Muirchertaig meic Donnchada (reign ?–1225), king of Uí Failghe
 Muirchertach mac Mael Morda (reign 1225–?), king of Uí Failghe